The Golden Sprint is a greyhound racing competition held annually at Romford Greyhound Stadium. It was inaugurated in 1987.

Venues & Distances 
1987–present (Romford 400m)

Past winners

Sponsors
1994–1994 (Bailey Racing)
2002–2006 (Coral)
2007–2013 (The Millennium Stand Bookmakers)
2014–present (Coral)

References

Greyhound racing competitions in the United Kingdom
Sport in the London Borough of Havering
Recurring sporting events established in 1987
1987 establishments in England